This is a list of ocean circulation models, as used in physical oceanography. Ocean circulation models can also be used to study chemical oceanography, biological oceanography, geological oceanography, and climate science.

Integrated ocean modeling systems 
Integrated ocean modeling systems use multiple coupled models. This coupling allows researchers to understand processes that happen among multiple systems that are usually modeled independently, such as the ocean, atmosphere, waves, and sediments. Integrated ocean modeling systems is helpful for specific regions: for example, the ESPreSSO model is used to study the Mid-Atlantic Bight region. Integrated ocean modeling systems often use data from buoys and weather stations for atmospheric forcing and boundary conditions. Two examples of integrated ocean modeling systems are:

COAWST: Coupled Ocean Atmosphere Wave Sediment Transport Modeling System  (uses ROMS as its ocean circulation component).
ESPreSSO: Experimental System for Predicting Shelf and Slope Optics (uses ROMS as its ocean circulation component).

References

Physical oceanography
Hydrology lists
Numerical climate and weather models